HD 93205, or V560 Carinae, is a binary stellar system, in the Carina Nebula (NGC 3372) in the constellation Carina. It consists of two massive O-stars that revolve around each other in 6 days.

The more massive member of the pair is an O3.5 main sequence star. The spectrum shows some ionised nitrogen and helium emission lines, indicating some mixing of fusion products to the surface and a strong stellar wind. This is somewhat lower than expected from evolutionary modelling of a star with its observed parameters.

It moves in its orbit at a speed of over 300 km/s and is considered to be a relativistic binary, which causes the apses of the orbit to change in a predictable way.

The closeness of the two stars causes them to become deformed, and this means that the observed brightness of the system varies slightly every six days during its orbit.  The total amplitude of the variation is only 0.02 magnitudes.

It is generally considered as a member of the open cluster Trumpler 16.  Among its neighbors are some of the most massive and luminous stars in the galaxy, like Eta Carinae, HD 93250 and the binary HD 93129.  It lies five arc-minutes from Eta Carinae.

References

Carina Nebula
O-type main-sequence stars
Spectroscopic binaries
Carinae, V560
Durchmusterung objects
093205
Carina (constellation)
Emission-line stars
Rotating ellipsoidal variables